Abel is a Biblical figure in the Book of Genesis within Abrahamic religions. He was the younger brother of Cain, and the younger son of Adam and Eve, the first couple in Biblical history. He was a shepherd who offered his firstborn flock up to God as an offering. God accepted his offering but not his brother's. Cain then killed Abel out of jealousy.

According to Genesis, this was the first murder in the history of mankind.

Interpretations

Jewish and Christian interpretations
His name in Hebrew is composed of the same three consonants as a root meaning "breath". Julius Wellhausen has proposed that the name is independent of the root. Eberhard Schrader had previously put forward the Akkadian (Old Assyrian dialect) ablu ("son") as a more likely etymology.

In Christianity, comparisons are sometimes made between the death of Abel and that of Jesus, the former thus seen as being the first martyr. In  Jesus speaks of Abel as "righteous", and the Epistle to the Hebrews states that "The blood of sprinkling ... [speaks] better things than that of Abel". The blood of Jesus is interpreted as bringing mercy; but that of Abel as demanding vengeance (hence the curse and mark).

Abel is invoked in the litany for the dying in the Roman Catholic Church, and his sacrifice is mentioned in the Canon of the Mass along with those of Abraham and Melchizedek. The Alexandrian Rite commemorates him with a feast day on December 28.

According to the Coptic Book of Adam and Eve (at 2:1–15), and the Syriac Cave of Treasures, Abel's body, after many days of mourning, was placed in the Cave of Treasures, before which Adam and Eve, and descendants, offered their prayers. In addition, the Sethite line of the Generations of Adam swear by Abel's blood to segregate themselves from the unrighteous.

In the Book of Enoch (22:7), regarded by most Christian and Jewish traditions as extra-biblical, the soul of Abel is described as having been appointed as the chief of martyrs, crying for vengeance, for the destruction of the seed of Cain. A similar view is later shown in the Testament of Abraham (A:13 / B:11), where Abel has been raised to the position as the judge of the souls.

In Bereshit Rabbah (22:2), a discussion of Gen. 4:1 ff. has Rabbi Yehoshua ben Korcha mentioning that Cain was born with a twin sister, and Abel with two twin sisters.  This is based on the principle that the otherwise superfluous accusative article "et" always conveys some additional teaching (Pesachim 22b). The "et"'s are parsed slightly differently in Yebamot 62a where the two "et"'s in Gen. 4:2 indicate Cain and his sister, and Abel and his (one) sister.

Sethian Gnostic interpretation
In the Apocryphon of John, a work belonging to Sethian Gnosticism, Abel is the offspring of Yaldaboath and Eve, who is placed over the elements of water and earth as Elohim, but was only given his name as a form of deception.

Mandaean interpretation

According to Mandaean beliefs and scriptures including the Qolastā, the Book of John and Genzā Rabbā, Abel is cognate with the angelic soteriological figure Hibil Ziwa, (sometimes translated "Splendid Hibel"), who is spoken of as a son of Hayyi or of Manda d-Hayyi, and as a brother to Anush (Enosh) and to Sheetil (Seth), who is the son of Adam. Elsewhere, Anush is spoken of as the son of Sheetil, and Sheetil as the son of Hibil, where Hibil came to Adam and Eve as a young boy when they were still virgins, but was called their son. Hibil is an important lightworld being (uthra) who conquered the World of Darkness. As Yawar Hibil, he is one of multiple figures known as Yawar, being so named by and after his father.

Islamic interpretation

According to Shi'a Muslim belief, Abel ("Habeel") is buried in the Nabi Habeel Mosque, located on the west mountains of Damascus, near the Zabadani Valley, overlooking the villages of the Barada river (Wadi Barada), in Syria. Shi'a are frequent visitors of this mosque for ziyarat. The mosque was built by Ottoman Wali Ahmad Pasha in 1599.

In modern media 
Abel is portrayed by Franco Nero in the film The Bible: In the Beginning... (1966).

Paul Rudd played the role of Abel in the 2009 film Year One.

Notes

References 

 
Bereshit (parashah)
Biblical murder victims
Book of Genesis people
Children of Adam and Eve
Male murder victims
Shepherds
Uthras
Hebrew Bible people in Mandaeism